Holme is a linear settlement and former civil parish, now in the parish of Messingham, in the North Lincolnshire district, in the county of Lincolnshire, England. The population of the civil parish at the 2011 census was 113. The civil parish was abolished on 1 April 2018 and merged into Messingham.

Just to the south-east is Grade II listed Twigmoor Hall. This house was the home of John Wright before he was executed for his part in the Gunpowder Plot. The authorities described Twigmoor Hall as ".. one of the worst in her Majesty’s dominions and is used like a Popish college for traitors in the northern parts".

References

External links 

Villages in the Borough of North Lincolnshire
Former civil parishes in Lincolnshire